Mateusz Praszelik (born 26 September 2000) is a Polish footballer who plays as a midfielder for Italian  club Cosenza on loan from  Hellas Verona.

Club career

Legia Warsaw
On 13 March 2019, he made his official debut for Legia against Raków Częstochowa, coming on at the 110th minute for Michał Kucharczyk in the Polish Cup fixture. On 21 July 2019, he made his Ekstraklasa debut against Pogoń Szczecin.

Śląsk Wrocław
On 7 July 2020, it was announced that Śląsk Wrocław had signed Praszelik on a four-year deal.

Hellas Verona
On 29 January 2022, Praszelik joined Serie A side Hellas Verona on loan until 31 January 2023, with an option to buy and a conditional obligation to buy.

Cosenza
On 26 January 2023, Praszelik was loaned by Verona to Cosenza in Serie B.

Honours
Legia Warsaw
Ekstraklasa: 2019–20

Individual
Ekstraklasa Young Player of the Month: August 2020, September 2021

References

Polish footballers
People from Racibórz
2000 births
Living people
Association football midfielders
Legia Warsaw II players
Legia Warsaw players
Śląsk Wrocław players
Hellas Verona F.C. players
Cosenza Calcio players
Ekstraklasa players
III liga players
Serie A players
Poland youth international footballers
Poland under-21 international footballers
Polish expatriate footballers
Expatriate footballers in Italy
Polish expatriate sportspeople in Italy